Ranulf de Vaux, may refer to:
Ranulf de Vaux of Sowerby
Ranulf de Vaux of Gilsland, 3rd Baron of Gilsland, died 1199.